Midnight Limited is a 1940 American mystery film directed by Howard Bretherton and written by Harrison Carter and Charles Williams. The film stars John 'Dusty' King, Marjorie Reynolds, George Cleveland, Edward Keane, Monte Collins and I. Stanford Jolley. It was released on March 20, 1940 by Monogram Pictures.

Plot

Cast          
John 'Dusty' King as Val Lennon
Marjorie Reynolds as Joan Marshall
George Cleveland as Prof. Van Dillon
Edward Keane as Capt. Harrigan
Monte Collins as Abel Krantz 
I. Stanford Jolley as Frenchie
Pat Flaherty as Train Conductor
Herbert Ashley as Trainman 
Lita Chevret as Mae Krantz

References

External links
 

1940 films
American mystery films
1940 mystery films
Monogram Pictures films
Films directed by Howard Bretherton
American black-and-white films
1940s English-language films
1940s American films